Ahmet  Şimşirgil is a Turkish historian.

Biography 
Ahmet Şimşirgil is a Turkish academic. He was born in Boyabat, Sinop, Turkey in 1959 where he completed elementary, middle and high school. In 1978 he was accepted to Atatürk University, Literature Faculty History Department in Erzurum, Turkey where he graduated in 1982. In 1983 he began work as a research assistant in the Yeniçağ Department of the same university completing his master‘s degree in 1985. In 1989 he transitioned to Istanbul Marmara University, Faculty of Science and Literature in the History Department.

With his 1990 book “Osmanlı Taşra Teşkilatı’nda Tokat (1455-1574)”, he was awarded a Doctorate and earned Associate Professor status in 1997 after writing his thesis “Uyvar’ın Osmanlılar Tarafından Fethi ve İdaresi”. Dr. Şimşirgil, who attained Professor status in 2003, has published many articles and books published about Ottoman history, politic life and governance. In addition to being a respected author and regular contributing writer for the daily newspaper Türkiye, Dr. Şimşirgil has published articles at the National and International level and appears on several television programs such as “Tarih ve Medeniyet”, “Başka Şeyleri”, "Tarih ve İnsan" on both Lalegül TV and TGRT Radio and "Tarih Sahnesi" on TRT1 TV.

Dr. Şimşirgil is currently a Professor of Ottoman History in the Faculty of Science and Literature at Marmara University in Istanbul. He is married with three children.

Critics 
Şimşirgil is under criticism in Germany, because he expressed homophobic and anti-israeli views.

Published works

Books 
1- Kayı I – Ertuğrul’un Ocağı (Timaş Yayınları) 

2- Kayı II – Cihan Devleti (Timaş Yayınları) 

3- Kayı III – Haremeyn Hizmetinde (Timaş Yayınları) 

4- Kayı IV – Ufukların Sultanı Kanuni (Timaş Yayınları) 

5- Kayı V – Kudret ve Azamet Yılları (Timaş Yayınları) 

6- Kayı VI – İmparatorluğun Zirvesi ve Dönüş (Timaş Yayınları) 

7- Kayı VII – Kutsal İttifaka Karşı (Timaş Yayınları) 

8- Kayı VIII – Islahat, Darbe ve Devlet (Timaş Yayınları) 

9- Kayı IX – Sonun Başlangıcı (Timaş Yayınları) 

10- Kayı X – II. Abdülhamid Han (Timaş Yayınları) 

11- Kayı XI – Elveda Vahideddin Han (Timaş Yayınları) 

12- Valide Sultanlar ve Harem (Timaş Yayınları) 

13- Denizler Fatihi Piyale Paşa ve Cerbe Zaferi (Timaş Yayınları) 

14- İstanbul, Fetih ve Fatih (İBB. Kültür A.Ş. Yayınları) 

15- Fethin Kahramanları (İBB Kültür A.Ş. Yayınları)

16- Ahmed Cevdet Paşa ve Mecelle (co-authored with Ekrem Buğra Ekinci) (Beylik Yayınları) 

17- Devr-i Gül Sohbetleri (Beylik Yayınları) 

18- Slovakya’da Osmanlılar (Beylik Yayınları) 

19- Bir Müstakil Dünya: Topkapı Sarayı (Timaş Yayınları) 

20- Kaptan Paşa’nın Seyir Defteri (BKY Yayınları) 

21- Otağ -I- Büyük Doğuş (Timaş Yayınları) 

22- Otağ -II- Emir Timur (Timaş Yayınları) 

23- Otağ -III- Sultan Alparslan (Timaş Yayınları) 

24- Eşrefoğlu Rûmî (IQ Kültür Sanat Yayıncılık) 

25- Osmanlı Gerçekleri I (Timaş Yayınları) 

26- Osmanlı Gerçekleri II (Timaş Yayınları) 

27- Sultan II. Kılıç Arslan ve Aksaray (IQ Kültür Sanat Yayıncılık) 

28- Asırlara Hitab Eden Alim Osman Hulusi Efendi (Nasihat Yayınları) 

29- Adalet Ustaları (co-authored with Pelin Çift) (Destek Yayınları) 

30- En Sevgili Efendimiz ve Sevdalıları (Timaş Yayınları) 

31- Barbaros Hayreddin Paşa (Timaş Yayınları) 

32- Mızraklı Hakikat (KTB Yayınları) 

33- Edep Yâ Hû (KTB Yayınları)

Articles published in the National Journal 
1- “Osmanlı Taşra Teşkilatında Rum Beylerbeyiliği”, Türklük Araştırmaları Dergisi, 5, 289-299 (1990).

2- “XVI. Yüzyılda Tokat Medreseleri” Tarih İncelemeleri Dergisi, VII, 227-242 (1992).

3- “Osmanlılar İdaresinde Zile Şehri (1455-1574)”, Türklük Araştırmaları Dergisi, 6, 231-243 (1991).

4- “XV ve XVI. Asırlarda Turhal”, Türklük Araştırmaları Dergisi, 8, 463-494 (1997).

5- “Osmanlılar İdaresinde Uyvar’ın Hazine Defterleri ve Bir Bütçe Örneği”, Güney Doğu Avrupa Araştırmaları Dergisi, 12, 325-355 (1998).

6- “XVI. Yüzyılda Amasya Şehri”, Tarih İncelemeleri Dergisi, XI, 77-109 (1996).

7- “Economic Life in Nove Zamky (Uyvar) During The Ottoman Period (1663-1683)” Foundation For Middle East And Balkan Studies (OBİV), Turkish Review of Balkan Studies, Annual 2001.

8- “The Kazas (townships) of Alakilise, Rahova, Ivraca, Izladi and Eski Cuma Subdivisions of the Sancak of Niğbolu in the Eighteenth Century”, Foundation For Middle East And Balkan Studies (OBİV), Turkish Review of Balkan Studies, Annual 2003.

Papers presented at international conferences 
1- Uyvar Eyaleti’nin Teşkili ve İdaresi, Uluslararası Osmanlı Tarihi Sempozyumu, (8-9 Nisan1999), İzmir.

2- 1663 Uyvar Sefer Yolu ve Şehrin Osmanlı İdaresindeki Konumu, Anadolu’da Tarihi Yollar ve Şehirler Semineri, Bildiriler, 79-98, İstanbul 2002
Ahmet Şimşirgil (2003) Birincil kaynaklardan Osmanlı tarihi ('Primary Sources of Ottoman History'): Kayı , Volume 1, Ertuğrul’un Ocağı,

References

External links 

 Personal Website

1959 births
Living people
Turkish non-fiction writers
21st-century Turkish historians
Academic staff of Marmara University
Date of birth missing (living people)